Mount Saint Mary College is a private Catholic college in Newburgh, New York. It was founded in 1959 by the Dominican Sisters.

The campus overlooks the Hudson River, halfway between New York City and Albany. More than 2,700 men and women are enrolled in over 50 undergraduate programs and three graduate degree programs. The Knights compete in NCAA Division III athletics in the Skyline Conference.

History

1853 - 1949 
Four German-speaking sisters of St. Dominic first arrived in New York City in 1853. They left the security of their convent of the Holy Cross in Regensburg, Germany to start a school in Pennsylvania. Plans went awry and the sisters opened a school on Second Street in lower Manhattan. Thirty years later, in 1883 at the request of the pastor of St. Mary's Church in Newburgh, a small group of sisters from the Second Street Convent opened Mount Saint Mary Academy off Gidney Avenue on property that had once belonged to the prosperous Harvey Weed family.

S. R. Van Duzer, a wealthy wholesale drug company owner, moved into A. Gerald Hull's Villa on the southeast side of the Thomas Powell estate in 1853. VanDuzer changed the name from Hull's Villa to Rozenhof. VanDuzer died in 1903; his wife six-months later. The property remained in the VanDuzer family until the death, in 1913, of the VanDuzer's daughter, Katherine VanDuzer Burton. Although the family was offered a grand sum for the property by the proprietors of a tuberculosis sanatorium, the VanDuzers instead turned to their neighbors, the Dominican sisters on Gidney Avenue. Even though their offer of $65,000 was less than half of what the VanDuzers had been offered by the eager sanitarium bidders, Rozenhof, the carriage house, the ice house and a hothouse were sold to the sisters, as they had outgrown the existing facilities on their property.

The new academy, called Greater Mount Saint Mary, opened in 1927 and served as a high school. A storehouse was rebuilt as the Casa San Jose and it served as the elementary school.

Because the Dominican Sisters were involved in education in Newburgh and throughout the New York-New Jersey area, even as far away as Puerto Rico, the demand for a teacher training program was evident. The New York State Education Department certified the Mount Saint Mary Normal and Training School in 1930. In 1934, the Commissioner of Education granted full approval to the program and Mount received the authority to issue teacher's certificates at the conclusion of the three-year program.

1950 - 1999 
In January 1955, the Board of Regents of the University of the State of New York granted the Mount a provisional charter to grant the degree of Associate in Arts upon the completion of the registered three-year curriculum. The Board of Regents voted to amend the college's charter on October 3, 1959. The Mount was now a four-year liberal arts college and opened its door to the first class of lay women in 1960. In June 1962, the Mount granted its first bachelor's degree, a Bachelor of Science in Education.

In 1963, Aquinas Hall, named after Saint Thomas Aquinas, opened. This three-story building became the centerpiece of the college's academic life. Guzman Hall opened the same year. It was originally the residence hall for the young Dominican novices. The first graduating class in 1964 consisted of 32 graduates. In May 1968, the college received full accreditation from the Middle States Association and in the spring of that year the first and only male student began taking classes at the newly co-ed Mount Saint Mary College. In 1970, 58 male students were enrolled at the college. 

In 1984, the college's first master's degree program was introduced leading to a Master of Science in Special Education.

2000 - present 
In February 2016, faculty acted on "longstanding concerns about academic freedom and shared governance under its current administration" by voting no confidence in the chair of the college's board of trustees. Dr. Anne Carson Daly left the Mount due to family responsibilities in March 2016, and James Raimo, Vice President for Facilities and Operations, took the helm as Acting President until August.

In August 2016, Dr. David A. Kennett, the Elizabeth Stillman Williams Professor of Economics at Vassar College, became interim president for a term of two years. During his time at the Mount, Kennett helped the college navigate accreditation through the Middle States Commission on Higher Education.

Following a nationwide search, Dr. Jason N. Adsit was appointed the college's seventh and current president and began his tenure at the Mount in June 2018.

Presidents
 Mother Leo Vincent Short, O.P. - (1960-1964)
 Sr. Mary Francis McDonald, O.P. - (1964-1972)
 Dr. William T. O'Hara - (1972-1976)
 Sr. Anne Sakac, O.P - (1976-2008)
 Fr. Kevin Mackin, O.F.M. - (2008-2014)
 Dr. Anne Carson Daly - (2014-2016)
 Mr. James Raimo - acting - (2016)
 Dr. David A. Kennett - interim - (2016-2018)
 Dr. Jason N. Adsit -  (2018-Present)

Academics
Mount Saint Mary College offers undergraduate and graduate degree programs and is accredited by The Middle States Commission on Higher Education. It was most recently re-accredited in 2007. The student-faculty ratio at Mount St. Mary College is 14:1. The most popular majors at Mount Saint Mary College include: Health Professions and Related Programs (Nursing, pre-professional programs, biology); Business, Management, Marketing, and Related Support Services; Psychology; and Social Sciences. The college also offers education certification. Two alumni from the Division of Education were named New York State Teachers of the Year in the past decade.

The college has 16 Honor Societies: Alpha Chi (general), Alpha Sigma Lambda (continuing education), Beta Beta Beta (biology), Chi Alpha Epsilon (economically and academically disadvantaged students), Delta Mu Delta (accounting and business), Gamma Nu Eta (information technology) Gamma Sigma Epsilon (chemistry), Kappa Delta Pi (education), Kappa Mu Epsilon (mathematics), Lambda Pi Eta (communication arts), Phi Alpha Theta (history), Psi Chi (psychology), Sigma Delta Pi (Hispanic Studies), Sigma Tau Delta (English), Sigma Theta Tau (nursing), and Tau Upsilon Alpha (human services).

Campus

Academic buildings

The campus is set on  overlooking the Hudson River. The college's buildings range from a 19th-century home and carriage house to a modern technology center and new or renovated residence halls with multiple housing options.

Aquinas Hall and the Kaplan Family Mathematics, Science & Technology Center (MST) is the Mount's main campus building. The MST Center has a Nursing Learning Resource Center, science and technology classrooms and labs, and a glass atrium. There are "smart classrooms" and large lecture halls, a media lab, the Campus Technology Center, and the Curtin Memorial Library. The Mount's newest dining commons, called "The View," opened in Fall 2010.

Hudson Hall is home to the Education Division, Residence Life, Student Activities, the HEOP office, Campus Ministry, and Security & Safety.  This building also houses an auditorium and ten "smart classrooms," the Knight Radio station, and an art gallery. Henry's Courtside Café offers hot and cold meals, snacks, fruit, vegetables, juices, and coffee.

The William and Elaine Kaplan Recreation Center is home to the Knights and of great Division III basketball, volleyball and swimming. For soccer, lacrosse and softball action, there are all-season turf athletic fields across from Hudson Hall. There is also a NCAA-regulation basketball court. The competition-sized pool, indoor running track, weight training/exercise, aerobic exercise rooms, and game rooms are also available to all students.

Whittaker Hall was the carriage house on the original estate.

The Villa was built in the 1840s. In the early years of the college, this Victorian building was the entire college - classes, residence hall, offices and library. Today the Villa houses the Admissions office, Community Relations, Marketing, the President's office, and the Vice President of Academic Affairs' office.

Dominican Center, built in 1927, was the motherhouse for the Dominican Sisters of Newburgh until the college purchased the facility in 2011. In January 2014, the renovated building opened to the campus and houses the Kaplan Family Library and Learning Center, a cafe, the Chapel of the Most Holy Rosary, and three floors of dormitories.

Residence Halls
Besides the dorms in the Dominican Center, there are a number of other dormitories on campus.

Sakac Hall is a freshman female residence hall. Each floor has a lounge area with a bathroom and study area. Additional amenities in the building include a movie theater room, laundry room, computer room, vending machines, fitness room, and a fully equipped kitchen.

Guzman Hall is a freshmen male residence hall.  The building contains multiple student lounges.

The College Courts are townhouse-style upperclassmen residences.  There are lounges in each building, and at least one full kitchen.

Student life

Student government
The Student Government Association is the legislative body for student life. It can recommend policy changes to the Vice President for Student Affairs and the president of the college. The Director of Student Activities advises the Student Government Association. Student representatives sit on major faculty committees and participate in ad hoc committees formed during the year. Mount Saint Mary's Commuter Council represents commuter students on campus, while the Resident Living Council represents students who live on campus. Student Government works with the Director of Student Activities to plan and implement activities such as film screenings, trips, plays, parties, dinner dances, coffeehouses, lectures, and yearbook (Thyme).

Student activities
The Student Activities offices, located in Hudson Hall, is a focal point for Student Activities and events. The center includes the Student Government, Mount Activities Programing and student publications offices, an auditorium, as well as meeting rooms and lounges. 

The college offers the MSMC Shuttle Van to transport students to local shopping areas and the Beacon Train Station. The shuttle is available on a first-come, first-served basis, with a Mount identification card.

Athletics
Mount Saint Mary College is an NCAA Division III school, with 21 competing teams. MSMC participates in the Eastern College Athletic Conference and the Skyline Conference. These intercollegiate athletics programs include baseball, basketball, women's cheerleading, cross-country, men's golf, lacrosse, soccer, softball, swimming, tennis, indoor/outdoor track and field, and women's volleyball. The college also sponsors intramural sports year round.

The Elaine and William Kaplan Recreation Center is the site of many athletic events on campus. The Kaplan Center houses basketball and volleyball courts, a running track, a pool, a weight room, an aerobics room and training facilities. The men's and women's basketball teams compete inside the Kaplan Center, as do the women's volleyball team and the men's and women's swimming teams. Kaplan Field is an all-season turf athletic field, located across from Hudson Hall that serves as the site for men's and women's soccer and lacrosse. Next to the turf athletic field are six tennis courts. The Mount also has a baseball/softball field complex located next to the Dominican Center.

Bishop Dunn Memorial School
The college includes a private K-8 school, Bishop Dunn Memorial School, which is located on the south end of its campus. 

In 2013 Saint Basil Academy educated its elementary and middle school students at Bishop Dunn Memorial. As of 2016 Bishop Dunn Memorial was still the K-8 school used by Saint Basil.

Notable alumni
Thomas Kirwan '70 - New York State Assembly - District 96
Tyler Tumminia '00 - Premier Hockey Federation commissioner, baseball executive
Karl A. Brabenec '01 - New York State Assembly - District 98
Denise Doring VanBuren - 45th president of the Daughters of the American Revolution

Finances
As of 2016, Mount Saint Mary College's endowment was $78 million.

References

External links

Official website
Official athletics website

|}

 
Educational institutions established in 1960
Dominican universities and colleges in the United States
Education in Orange County, New York
Newburgh, New York
1960 establishments in New York (state)
Catholic universities and colleges in New York (state)
Association of Catholic Colleges and Universities
Buildings and structures in Newburgh, New York